Tylecodon aurusbergensis is a species of plant in the family Crassulaceae. It is endemic to Namibia.  Its natural habitat is rocky areas. It is threatened by habitat loss.

References

aurusbergensis
Endemic flora of Namibia
Near threatened flora of Africa
Taxonomy articles created by Polbot